James P Morrison was a Scottish Lawn bowls international who competed in the 1934 British Empire Games.

Bowls career
At the 1934 British Empire Games he won the bronze medal in the rinks (fours) event with William Lowe, Charles Tait and James Brown.

References

Scottish male bowls players
Bowls players at the 1934 British Empire Games
Commonwealth Games bronze medallists for Scotland
Commonwealth Games medallists in lawn bowls
Medallists at the 1934 British Empire Games